Lauriane Rougeau (born April 12, 1990) is a Canadian ice hockey player in her second stint with the CWHL's Les Canadiennes de Montreal. A former All-America selection for the Cornell Big Red women's ice hockey program, Rougeau was part of the Stars team that captured the inaugural Clarkson Cup in 2009. Competing in Ice hockey at the 2014 Winter Olympics, she was part of Canada's gold medal triumph. Having also earned a gold medal at the 2012 IIHF Women's World Championship, she is among a rare group of Canadian female hockey players that have won the Clarkson Cup, IIHF World Gold and Winter Games gold.

Playing career
Rougeau played midget hockey for the Lac St. Louis Tigres. In 2002, she won a gold medal at the Atom AA Quebec Provincials while playing with the Lakeshore Panthers. Three years later, she won a silver medal with Quebec at the 2005 National Women's Under-18 Championships.

In 2005, Rougeau was part of the team that took first place at the Québec Atom AA championships. Her team also took first place at the 2005 Jeux du Québec.

At the 2007 Canada Winter Games, Rougeau won the bronze with Quebec. In the same year, she represented Quebec at the National Women's Under-18 Championship and was awarded a silver medal.

Ligue de hockey féminin collégial AA
In 2007–08, Rougeau factored in the Cheminots du Cégep St-Jérôme  winning the Collégial AA championship with a perfect 27–0 record. The following year, she helped Dawson Blues to a 31–1 record and a runner-up finish in the Collégial AA playoffs of 2008–09. For the season, she led Dawson defenders in scoring. Dawson competed in the 2009 Junior Women's Hockey League Challenge Cup in Washington, D.C. and Rougeau helped the team win the tournament.

NCAA
Rougeau joined Cornell in 2009 and was named an NCAA Second Team All-American and Ivy League Rookie of the Year. She ranked second among Cornell defenders and freshmen in scoring in 2009–10. Rougeau ranked third overall in Cornell scoring in 2009–10. As a rookie, she was part of the Cornell team that played in the NCAA championship game at the 2010 Frozen Four, but were defeated by the Minnesota Duluth Bulldogs.

CWHL
Despite playing minor hockey, Rougeau was part of the Montreal Axion which had a runner-up finish in the 2006–07 NWHL season. In 2009, she competed for the Montreal Stars and was part of a Clarkson Cup victory.

Hockey Canada
Rougeau assisted on the first goal in the history of the Canadian National Women's Under 18 program (on August 23, 2007 in Ottawa, Ontario). The goal would be scored by future Cornell teammate Catherine White. In addition, she was team captain for that game. She was captain once more, as part of Canada's National Women's Under-18 Team as they won a silver medal at the 2008 IIHF World Women's Under-18 Championships. She was recognized as Top Defender.

She would compete with Canada's National Women's Under-22 Team in 2008 as part of a three-game series vs. the United States in Pierrefonds, Quebec. In August 2009, she would play for the team for another three game series against the US (this time in Calgary, Alberta). The following year, she would participate in another series vs. the US (contested in Toronto, Ontario).

Rougeau competed in the MLP Cup on three separate occasions. She won a silver medal at the 2009 MLP Cup in Ravensburg, the gold medal at the 2010 and 2011 MLP Cup, respectively. On October 3, 2011, she was named to the Team Canada roster that will participate in the 2011 4 Nations Cup. In a game versus Russia at the 2012 IIHF Women's World Championship, Rougeau logged a goal and an assist in a 14–1 victory.

Career statistics

Hockey Canada

NCAA

Awards and honours
Collégial AA Rookie of the Year (2007–08)
Collégial AA First All-Star Team in 2007–08
Collégial AA First All-Star Team in 2008–09
Collegial AA Academic All-Star, 2008–09
Quill and Dagger Senior Honor Society, Cornell University

IIHF
Directorate Award, Best Defender, 2008 IIHF Under 18 Women's World Championships

NCAA
Ivy League Rookie of the Year in 2009–10
RBK Hockey/AHCA Women's Division I 2009–10 Second Team All-American
Finalist, 2010 ECAC Best Defensive Defenseman Award
2010–11 All-ECAC First Team
2011 Second Team All-America selection
2010–11 Second Team All-Ivy

References

External links
 
 
 
 
 

1990 births
Canadian expatriate ice hockey players in the United States
Canadian women's ice hockey defencemen
Clarkson Cup champions
Cornell Big Red women's ice hockey players
Dawson College alumni
Ice hockey people from Quebec
Ice hockey players at the 2014 Winter Olympics
Ice hockey players at the 2018 Winter Olympics
Les Canadiennes de Montreal players
Living people
Medalists at the 2014 Winter Olympics
Medalists at the 2018 Winter Olympics
Olympic gold medalists for Canada
Olympic silver medalists for Canada
Olympic ice hockey players of Canada
Olympic medalists in ice hockey
People from Pointe-Claire
Professional Women's Hockey Players Association players